A professional certification, trade certification, or professional designation (often called simply certification or qualification) is a designation earned by a person to assure that he/she is qualified to perform a job or task. Certifications, generally, need to be renewed periodically, or may be valid for a specific period of time (e.g. the lifetime of the product upon which the individual is certified). As a part of a complete renewal of an individual's certification, it is common for the individual to show evidence of continual learning — often termed continuing education — or earning continuing education units (CEU).

References 

 
Standards